Osborne High School may refer to one of several high schools in the United States:

Osborne High School (Kansas)  — Osborne, Kansas
Osborne High School (Georgia) — Marietta, Georgia
Cci/Somers - Osborne School — Somers, Connecticut
Osborn High School — Detroit, Michigan